Verticordia endlicheriana var. manicula is a flowering plant in the myrtle family, Myrtaceae and is endemic to the south-west of Western Australia. It is usually a small, compact shrub with sweetly-perfumed, lemon-yellow flowers which change colour through red to brown as they age.

Description

Flowering occurs from September to November.

Taxonomy and naming
Verticordia endlicheriana was first formally described by Johannes Conrad Schauer in 1844 and the description was published in Lehmann's Plantae Preissianae. In 1991, Alex George undertook a review of the genus Verticordia and described five varieties of Verticordia endlicheriana including this variety. The type collection for this variety was gathered near Carnamah by Alex George and Elizabeth Berndt. The varietal name "manicula" is derived from a Latin word meaning little hand referring to the hand-like shape of the petals.

Distribution and habitat
This variety usually grows in sand with  gravel, as well as gravelly loam, often with other verticordias, in heath and shrubland. It occurs from north of Mingenew to Moore River in the south and to Morawa, Goomalling and Dowerin in the Avon Wheatbelt, Geraldton Sandplains and Swan Coastal Plain in the biogeographic regions.

Conservation
Verticordia endlicheriana var. manicula is classified as "not threatened" by the Western Australian Government Department of Parks and Wildlife.

Use in horticulture
This verticordia is attractive, even as the flowers change colour, which they do over a longer period than var. endlicheriana. It has been propagated from cuttings and has grown well in full sun with an occasional light pruning.

References

endlicheriana
Rosids of Western Australia
Eudicots of Western Australia
Plants described in 1991